Wu Junsheng, or Wu Tsi-cheng, 吳俊陞, (1863–1928) was a Chinese general and commander-in-chief of the cavalry in the Fengtian Army.

Wu Junsheng was born to a peasant family in Changtu, Fengtian province (today Liaoning), on November 23, 1863. He joined a cavalry troop in 1880 and helped crush the Manchu independence plan (supported by the Japanese) in 1912. He supported Yuan Shikai's monarchy in 1915 and Zhang Zuolin's effort to seize Manchuria. He was rewarded with the military and civil governorship of Heilongjiang in March 1921 and promoted to commander of the 5th Army in 1924. He held those posts until June 1928, when he was one of those killed when a Japanese officer set a bomb to blow up a railroad car carrying Zhang Zuolin, who was also killed. He adopted his nephew Wu Tailai (吳泰來) as heir.

References

External links
  Rulers: China Administrative divisions
  'Modern Warfare in China in 1924-1925': Soviet film propaganda to support Chinese militarist Zhang Zuolin
  INSECURITY, OUTLAWRY AND SOCIAL ORDER: BANDITRY IN CHINA'S HEILONGJIANG FRONTIER REGION, 1900–1931
 吴俊升全传

Republic of China warlords from Liaoning
1863 births
1928 deaths
Politicians from Tieling
Assassinated Chinese politicians
Members of the Fengtian clique
Governors of Heilongjiang